Sackville Walter Lane-Fox (24 March 1797 – 18 August 1874), was a British Conservative Party politician.

Background
Lane-Fox was the son of James Fox-Lane, of Bramham Park, West Yorkshire, by the Honourable Mary Lucy, daughter of George Pitt, 1st Baron Rivers. He was the brother of George Lane-Fox and the uncle of Augustus Pitt Rivers.

Political career
Lane-Fox was returned to parliament as one of two representatives for Helston in 1831. He became the sole representative after the 'Great' or 'First' Reform Act of that year reduced the low-electorate constituency to one seat. He lost the seat in 1835, and remained out of the House of Commons until 1840, when he was returned for Beverley in East Yorkshire.
He lost the seat the following year and was re-elected to the Commons the year after as one of two MPs for Ipswich, Suffolk. In 1847 he was once again elected for Beverley, a seat he held until 1852.

Family
Lane-Fox married Lady Charlotte Mary Anne Georgiana Osborne, daughter of George Osborne, 6th Duke of Leeds, in 1826. She died in January 1836, aged 44.  They had five children:

  Elizabeth Catherine (died 29 October 1879, aged 50) married  R W Cracroft, rector of Harrington, Lincolnshire.
 Hon. Lora Mary (died 12 February 1908)
 Hon. Sackville George (14 September 1827 – 24 August 1888) succeeded his maternal uncle the Duke of Leeds as 12th Baron Conyers in 1859.
 Hon. Charles Pierrepont Darcy (25 August 1830 – 13 September 1874), wounded at the Battle of Alma while an officer in the Crimean war
 Marcia Frederica Isabella

The family received rents of land and buildings (the leases commencing between 1836 and 1843) for the duration of the lives of three of Lane-Fox's children, assigned by his cousin Francis D'Arcy-Osborne, 7th Duke of Leeds, mainly in the Cornish parishes of Breage, Camborne, Germoe, Ludgvan, St Erth and Wendron — which brought annual income of  £5,000.  On Elizabeth's death these freehold reversions (or near-equivalents) reverted to the ownership of the then-heir of the senior branch, George Osborne, 9th Duke of Leeds.

Sackville Walter Lane Fox after the death of his wife had a relationship with Charlotte Susannah Olding (1825-1881) and they had two daughters the eldest Charlotte Alice Fox surname Olding was born 18 January 1850 and the younger Lucy Susannah Charlotte surname Fox born 27 March 1855.

Charlotte Alice Fox Olding was born at 11 Burton Street London and was Baptised eleven years later (5 August 1861) as Alice Florence Marion Fox at St Saviour Jersey by The Rector William Corbet Le Breton who was the Father of Lillie Langtry - The Jersey Lily.
Florence died 24 July 1926 as Florence Alice Marion Fox-Bryant

Lucy Susannah Charlotte was born at 12 Hill Street Knightsbridge but her mother's address at the time was 17 Cowley Street Westminster.  Lucy died in Kensington in 1927.

There are no marriage records for Sackville Walter Lane Fox and Charlotte Susannah Olding. Charlotte Susannah Olding does have two death certificates one as Charlotte Susannah Fox widow of Sackville Walter Lane Fox which was superseded by a death certificate in the name of Susannah Charlotte Olding.

References

External links
 

1797 births
1874 deaths
Conservative Party (UK) MPs for English constituencies
Members of the Parliament of the United Kingdom for Helston
UK MPs 1831–1832
UK MPs 1832–1835
UK MPs 1837–1841
UK MPs 1841–1847
UK MPs 1847–1852
Tory MPs (pre-1834)
Members of the Parliament of the United Kingdom for Ipswich
Sackville